Luiz Eduardo Garagorri (born May 28, 1989) is a Brazilian mixed martial artist who competes in the Featherweight  division. He competed for the Ultimate Fighting Championship.

Background

Son of a Brazilian father and an Uruguayan mother, Garagorri spends most of his time in Santana do Livramento, a Brazilian city that’s on the other side of the border from the Uruguayan city of Rivera. Garagorri has been fighting professionally since 2015, when he decided to quit his job as a lawyer at his mother’s law firm to dedicate himself full time to martial arts.

Mixed martial arts career

Early career

Starting his career in 2015, Garagorri compiled a perfect 12–0 record fighting for a variety of regional Uruguayan and Brazilian promotions, before he was scouted by the UFC for their first event in Uruguay at UFC Fight Night: Shevchenko vs. Carmouche 2.

Ultimate Fighting Championship

Garagorri made his UFC debut against Humberto Bandenay on August 10, 2019 at UFC on ESPN+ 14. He won the fight via unanimous decision.

Garagorri faced Ricardo Ramos on November 16, 2019 at UFC on ESPN+ 22. He lost the fight via a rear-naked choke in round one.
A featherweight bout between Mirsad Bektić and Luiz Eduardo Garagorri was scheduled for UFC Fight Night: Covington vs. Woodley. However, Garagorri was pulled from the fight on September 15 after one of his cornermen tested positive for COVID-19. Bektić faced returning veteran Damon Jackson.

Garagorri faced Darren Elkins on November 7, 2020 at UFC on ESPN: Santos vs. Teixeira. He lost the fight via a submission in round three.

On December 8, 2020, it was announced that the UFC had released him.

Post-UFC career
Garagorri faced the undefeated William de Tarcio at Brazilian Fighting Series 10 on May 29, 2022.  Garagorri won the bout, stopping Tarcio via TKO stoppage in the first round.

Mixed martial arts record

| Win
|align=center| 14–2
|William de Tarcio
|TKO (punches)
|Brazilian Fighting Series 10
|
|align=center|1
|align=center|2:41
|São Paulo, Brazil
|-
| Loss
| align=center| 13–2
| Darren Elkins
|Submission (rear-naked choke)
|UFC on ESPN: Santos vs. Teixeira
|
|align=center|3
|align=center|2:22
|Las Vegas, Nevada, United States
|
|-
| Loss
| align=center| 13–1
| Ricardo Ramos
| Submission (rear-naked choke)
|UFC Fight Night: Błachowicz vs. Jacaré 
|
|align=center|1 
|align=center|3:57
|São Paulo, Brazil
|
|-
| Win
| align=center| 13–0
| Humberto Bandenay
|Decision (unanimous)
|UFC Fight Night: Shevchenko vs. Carmouche 2 
|
|align=center|3
|align=center|5:00
|Montevideo, Uruguay
|
|-
| Win
| align=center| 12–0
| Stevens Diogo
| Submission (rear-naked choke)
| UDC Internacional: Duelo de Leones 4
| 
| align=center| 1
| align=center| 2:37
| Rivera, Uruguay
|
|-
| Win
| align=center|11–0
| Agustin Marquez Tejera
| TKO (punches)
| Fronteira Fight 5
| 
| align=center|1
| align=center|1:30
| Santana do Livramento, Brazil
|
|-
| Win
| align=center|10–0
| Pablo Sepulveda
| Submission (heel hook)
| UDC Internacional: Duelo de Leones International
| 
| align=center|1
| align=center|N/A
| Rivera, Uruguay
|
|-
| Win
| align=center|9–0
| Jose Trindade
| Submission
| MMA International 2018: Reyno vs. Kakiuchi
| 
| align=center|1
| align=center|2:40
| Punta del Este, Uruguay
|
|-
| Win
| align=center|8–0
| Rafael Raul Peluffo Cossio
|Submission (rear-naked choke)
| Rivera Xtreme Challenge 2
| 
| align=center|1
| align=center|0:30
| Rivera, Uruguay
|
|-
| Win
| align=center| 7–0
| Daniel Ferreira dos Santos
| Submission (rear-naked choke)
| International Thai Stadium 2
| 
| align=center|1
| align=center|2:02
| Santana do Livramento, Brazil
| 
|-
| Win
| align=center| 6–0
| Nilton Gaviao
| Decision (unanimous)
| X-Fest MMA 9
|
|align=Center|3
|align=center|5:00
|Porto Alegre, Brazil
| 
|-
| Win
| align=center| 5–0
| Vinicius Trindade
| TKO (punches)
| Fronteira Fight 4
| 
| align=center| 1
| align=center| 2:50
| Santana do Livramento, Brazil
| 
|-
| Win
| align=center| 4–0
| Victor Rodriguez
| Submission (arm-triangle choke)
| Duelo de Leones
| 
| align=center| 3
| align=center| 3:30
| Rivera, Uruguay
| 
|-
| Win
| align=center| 3–0
| Manuel Boris
| Decision (unanimous)
| Final Conflict Championship 10
| 
| align=center| 3
| align=center| 5:00
| Cordoba, Argentina
| 
|-
| Win
| align=center| 2–0
| Edson da Rosa
| TKO (punches)
| Fronteira Fight 3
| 
| align=center| 1
| align=center| 0:40
| Santana do Livramento, Brazil
|
|-
| Win
| align=center| 1–0
| Giuliano Primaz
| TKO (kick to the body and punches)
| Fronteira Fight 2
| 
| align=center| 1
| align=center| 0:25
| Santana do Livramento, Brazil
|

See also 
 List of male mixed martial artists

References

External links 
  
  

1989 births
Living people
Featherweight  mixed martial artists
Uruguayan people of Brazilian descent
Uruguayan male mixed martial artists
Ultimate Fighting Championship male fighters
People from Santana do Livramento